Johnny McDowell (January 29, 1915 – June 8, 1952) was an American racecar driver from Delavan, Illinois.  He died in a qualifying crash at the Milwaukee Mile the week after the 1952 Indy 500.

Racing career
McDowell was raised in Pasadena, California.  He began racing cars at Legion Ascot Speedway in 1934.  He later moved on to the independent circuits in the Northwestern United States.  He then moved to the CSRA circuit based in Ohio.  He had his first experience at the Indianapolis 500 as a riding mechanic for Frank Wearne in 1937.  McDowell raced against top midget car drivers at Gilmore Stadium in 1939.  He held the points lead until September, and he finished second in the points behind Bob Swanson.  He won thirteen features at the track, and is ninth on the track's all-time win list.  McDowell finished second in the AAA West Coast midget car points standings in 1947.  He also won the 1947 Turkey Night Grand Prix.

McDowell moved to the Midwestern United States in 1948.  He won at least eight AAA midget car features, and won the 1948 Soldier Field title.

McDowell competed in the 1949 to 1952 Indianapolis 500 races.  He was killed at the Champ Car race at the Milwaukee Mile on June 8, 1952 at age 37.

Career awards
He was inducted in the National Midget Auto Racing Hall of Fame in 2003.

Indianapolis 500 results

World Championship career summary
The Indianapolis 500 was part of the FIA World Championship from 1950 through 1960. Drivers competing at Indy during those years were credited with World Championship points and participation. Johnny McDowell participated in 3 World Championship races but scored no World Championship points.

References

External links

1915 births
1952 deaths
People from Delavan, Illinois
Sportspeople from Pasadena, California
Racing drivers from Illinois
Racing drivers from California
Indianapolis 500 drivers
AAA Championship Car drivers
Racing drivers who died while racing
Sports deaths in Wisconsin